Ruellia capitata (syn. Strobilanthes capitatus T.Anders., Strobilanthes pentstemonoides T.Anders.) is a plant native to Cerrado vegetation of Argentina, Brazil, and Paraguay.

See also
 List of plants of Cerrado vegetation of Brazil

External links
Plant diversity in Paraguay: Ruellia brevicaulis
Ruellia brevicaulis in Phenology of the herbaceous layer in a campo sujo community in the Fazenda Água Limpa, Federal District, Brazil

brevicaulis